The electoral district of Ferntree Gully was an electorate of the Victorian Legislative Assembly.  It was created in 2002 as a replacement for the abolished electorate of Knox.

The district comprised Ferntree Gully and its neighbouring suburbs at the foothills of the Dandenong Ranges.

When it was created, it had a notional Liberal majority of 7.6% suggesting it would be a fairly safe Liberal seat. However, Labor Party's Anne Eckstein won the seat at the 2002 election on the back of the Labor landslide. But at the following election in 2006, Eckstein lost Ferntree Gully to Liberal Nick Wakeling in a very close contest for the seat. The final result revealed a margin of 27 votes, or 0.04%.

The seat was abolished by the Electoral Boundaries Commission ahead of the 2022 election and split into the electoral districts of Bayswater, Rowville and Monbulk.

Members for Ferntree Gully

Election results

References

External links
 Electorate profile: Ferntree Gully, Victorian Electoral Commission

2002 establishments in Australia
Former electoral districts of Victoria (Australia)
2022 disestablishments in Australia